Solre-sur-Sambre Castle is a castle in Solre-sur-Sambre in the municipality of Erquelinnes, province of Hainaut, Wallonia, Belgium.

The castle was built around the turn of the 13th and 14th centuries and retains much of the medieval structure. It is the property of the Princes de Merode.

See also
List of castles in Belgium

External links
 Erquelinnes municipal website 
 Chateauxdebelgique.eu: Solre-sur-Sambre 
  Official website of the Castle of Solre-sur-Sambre 

Castles in Belgium
Castles in Hainaut (province)